Karl Göran Åberg (born 7 October 1956) is a Swedish curler.

Teams

Personal life
His older brother Gunnar is also a curler.

References

External links

Living people
1956 births
Swedish male curlers
Swedish curling champions